Fionnuala Ellwood (born 3 July 1964 in Dublin, Ireland) is an actress best known for portraying Lynn Whiteley in the ITV soap Emmerdale between 1989 and 1994.

Early life
She attended Wilmslow County Grammar School for Girls.

Career
Other appearances include Doctors, Grange Hill, Holby City and Casualty.

Following a successful career in theatre and television, Ellwood raised a family in the 1990s and is now a specialist drama teacher and Advanced Drawing & Talking therapeutic practitioner, working with children and young people.

References

External links

1964 births
Living people
Irish television actresses
Actresses from Dublin (city)
People from Wilmslow